Shternberg is a surname, a variant of Sternberg, either a Yiddish spelling or a transliteration from Russian. Notable people with this surname include:

Pavel Shternberg
Lev Shternberg
Yankev Shternberg

See also

ru:Штернберг